The 1987 French Grand Prix was a Formula One motor race held on 5 July 1987 at the Circuit Paul Ricard, Le Castellet. It was the sixth race of the 1987 Formula One World Championship. It was the 65th French Grand Prix and the eleventh to be held at Paul Ricard, and the second to be held on the shortened version of the circuit.

The race was won by British driver Nigel Mansell, driving a Williams-Honda, after he started from pole position. Mansell took his second victory of the season by 7.7 seconds from Brazilian teammate Nelson Piquet, with local driver Alain Prost third in a McLaren-TAG.

Drivers' Championship leader, Brazilian Ayrton Senna, finished fourth in his Lotus-Honda, which was enough for him to retain the championship lead by one point over Prost, with Piquet and Mansell three and six points behind respectively.

Race summary

Qualifying
For the first time since the 1986 Mexican Grand Prix, a non-Honda powered car was on the front row in the shape of the McLaren-TAG of Alain Prost, who qualified second. The pole position was taken once again by Nigel Mansell in his Williams-Honda, while the second row was occupied by Ayrton Senna's Lotus-Honda and Nelson Piquet's Williams. The fast nature of the circuit clearly suited the turbo cars: the best placed non-turbo driver was Ivan Capelli in the March 871 in 22nd place, about six seconds off the pace and  slower on the Mistral Straight than the Williams-Hondas.

Even though the Mistral used in 1987 was some 800 metres shorter than when Formula One last used the full circuit at Paul Ricard in 1985, the sheer acceleration and top speed of the Williams-Hondas was comparable to the top speeds seen at the circuit from the  season cars.

During qualifying Arrows driver Derek Warwick gave a view on the strength of the turbocharged Honda RA167-E V6 engine and the acceleration advantage Williams had over the field since the opening round in Brazil. He noted that on one lap he entered the Mistral approximately 50 metres ahead of Piquet's Williams. Despite the known power of the Megatron (formerly BMW) turbo, Warwick claimed by the time they got to Signes just over one kilometre later the acceleration of the Honda had seen Piquet around 100 metres ahead of the Arrows A10.

Race
At the lights, Michele Alboreto jumped the start, whilst his Ferrari teammate Gerhard Berger stalled. Nigel Mansell led away and was joined by teammate Nelson Piquet at the front after he passed Prost on the Mistral Straight. Eddie Cheever retired his Arrows A10 on lap one after accidentally setting off the fire extinguisher whilst attempting to adjust the turbo boost. Andrea de Cesaris (Brabham BT56) then collided with Stefan Johansson, the McLaren requiring a pit stop for a damaged nosecone; the debris of his car caused some trouble to Mansell who ran into them.

Mansell, Piquet and Prost were engaged in a gripping battle for the lead, separated by just two seconds. On lap 19, Piquet spun and Prost passed him for second. Meanwhile, Senna was holding onto a creditable fourth place. On lap 30, Piquet pitted for new tyres, followed two laps later by Senna. Meanwhile, Thierry Boutsen (Benetton B187) retired with electrical failure. Both Mansell and Prost came in for new tyres on lap 36, handing the lead to Piquet. Mansell completed his stop and closed rapidly on Piquet, breaking fastest lap records. On lap 46, at the Le Beausset corner, Piquet made an error and Mansell passed him on the inside to take a lead he would not lose. On lap 65 Piquet made a second stop which went wrong when the engine stalled, delaying him by an additional eight seconds. After exiting the pits, he caught and passed Prost (who was dealing with an electrical problem) on lap 67.

Piquet was about 20 seconds behind Mansell, but on the final laps he was gaining at two seconds a lap. With seven laps to go, the gap was reduced to just 13 seconds, but Mansell paced himself to win by 7.7 seconds. Johansson had fought courageously up to sixth place after two pit stops to repair damages on his McLaren, but retired just five laps from the chequered flag.

In his home race, Prost took the final podium place some 48 seconds behind Piquet. Senna finished fourth ahead of Teo Fabi's Benetton B187 in fifth. Philippe Streiff drove a superb race to take his first World Championship point and the victory for the Jim Clark Trophy in his Tyrrell-Ford.

Classification

Qualifying

Race 
Numbers in brackets refer to positions of normally aspirated entrants competing for the Jim Clark Trophy.

Championship standings after the race

Drivers' Championship standings

Constructors' Championship standings

Jim Clark Trophy standings

Colin Chapman Trophy standings

References

French Grand Prix
French Grand Prix
Grand Prix
French Grand Prix